Rusin is an alternate transliteration for Rusyn.

Rusin may also refer to:
 Rusín, a village and municipality in the Moravian-Silesian Region, Czech Republic
 Rusin (surname), a surname
 Rūsiņš of Satekle (died 1212), Latgalian duke
 26390 Rušin, an asteroid

See also
 
 Russin (disambiguation)
 Rusyn (disambiguation)